William Judd (1 May 1864 – 25 December 1906) was a New Zealand cricketer. He played in two first-class matches for Wellington in 1886/87.

See also
 List of Wellington representative cricketers

References

External links
 

1864 births
1906 deaths
New Zealand cricketers
Wellington cricketers
People from Greytown, New Zealand